Miles Kasiri (born 29 January 1987) is a retired British professional tennis player.

Career 
Kasiri is a former student of the Nick Bollettieri Tennis Academy, where he reached the Boys' Singles Final of the 2004 Wimbledon Championships. He was defeated by Gaël Monfils 7–5, 7–6(8-6).

In 2005, Kasiri was suspended by the Lawn Tennis Association's national training for three-months for demonstrating behavioural problems and lack of effort.

Junior Grand Slam finals

Singles: 1 (1 runner-up)

ATP Challenger and ITF Futures finals

Singles: 2 (0–2)

Doubles: 2 (0–2)

References

External links
 
 

1986 births
Living people
British male tennis players
20th-century British people
21st-century British people